is a Japanese manga by Mitsuru Sugaya, which ran in CoroCoro Comic from 1978 to 1984. It focus on Arashi Ishino, a young gamer whose life revolves around video games. The manga, which is one of the earliest Japanese video game-themed comics, sold over 5 million copies. The series was adapted as a popular anime television show that aired in 1982 in Japan on Mondays from 7:00pm to 7:30pm.; and in Hong Kong.

In Japanese, the word "Arashi" means "storm". In Hong Kong, the show aired under the title 電子神童, which translates to "Electronic Prodigy". The series was considered iconic in Asia , since it came at a time when the public was being exposed to video games for the first time. The manga and TV series opened the imagination and possibilities of what gaming entertainment was about, while boosting its popularity as a new phenomenon.

Story
The story is about a young boy named Arashi Ishino who is obsessed with video games. He would spend all his time trying to beat the games and conquer the local arcades. He would meet competitors like Satoru Daimonji and Ishii, who would try to out match him with higher scores. At a certain point in each episode, he would display his special skill of unleashing a top which will spin so fast that both the top and his hands would catch on fire. On release, the spin would land on or near the cabinet panels, turning the ordinary button into a turbo button thus giving him a major advantage. His appearance is known for being bucktoothed, and he always wears a hat labeled "Arashi" with a picture of a sprited alien.

Game Center Arashi was the first animation with a gamer as the lead character and have the plot revolve around life with competitive gaming. Some of the games featured in the show include Space Invaders, Breakout, Galaxian, though they were not explicitly named. Some of Arashi's gaming techniques even have special names like "Blazed Top", "Vacuum Hurricane Shot", "Fish Stance".

Characters

Anime

Staff

Original broadcast

Additional versions and appearances
In 1999, the series spawned a PlayStation novel called Game Center Arashi R. In 2004, Microsoft Tokyo used the character of Arashi as a mascot to boost Xbox sales and image.

In 2006 the Let's TV Play Classic series of Plug and Plays used Arashi as a mascot.

See also
Arcade Gamer Fubuki - A 1998 manga which reused the concept of a powerful gamer in the arcades.
Hi Score Girl - A 2010 manga which revolves around the life of a gamer and the arcade gaming scene.

References

External links
Official site
Game Center Arashi Manga info

Arashi reborn for Xbox
Author

1978 manga
1982 anime television series debuts
Anime series based on manga
CoroCoro Comic
Nippon TV original programming
Shōnen manga
Shin-Ei Animation
Shogakukan manga
Shogakukan franchises
Winners of the Shogakukan Manga Award for children's manga
Works about video games